Altharakkal Sree Muthappan Madapura is a temple, located at Pullur Village about 6.2 km from Kanhangad City and 25 km from Kasaragod City in Kasaragod District, Kerala. Principal deity of the temple is Sree Muthappan, whose divinity is presented as a ritualistic theyyam enactment in two versions called Thiruvappana and Vellattam. According to the local tradition the presiding deity is a manifestation of Lord Shiva.

Festival Details
The festival at Altharakkal Sree Muthappan Madapura is last of the month of Makaram (mid-February).

During the festival season, after the rituals Ganapati homam. The Malayirakkal (invoking) of Sri Muthappan is done by Kunnathurpadi.

Thiruvappana and Vellattam appear simultaneously on ulsavam season.

Puthari Vellattam festival, conducted It is associated with the harvesting season of the region.

Myths and Legends about Sree Muthappan

Sree Muthappan is believed to be the personification of two divine figures - Thiruvappana and Vellatom. Fundamentally the dual divine figures Thiruvappana and vellatom are not very different from the Theyyamkaliyattem of the north Malabar region. Though Sree Muthappan represents a single god, it represents two godly figures, Vishnu (with fish-shaped crown) and Shiva (a crescent-shaped crown).

Sri Muthappan as a theyyam is performed year-round whereas other theyyams are seasonal (lasting October to May).

Several Muthappan Temples are seen in different parts of Kannur and Kasaragod district. This shows the popularity of the God in the minds of the people of these two districts. Each madappura has its own tradition.

Story of Altharakkal Sree Muthappan Madapura
One interesting story relating to the God Muthappan is about the Altharakkal Sree Muthappan Madappura. It tells philosophical, devotional and educational importance of Pullur. There is an interesting story regarding the construction of Sree Muthappan Temple.

As a result of the formation of a committee and the great work done by the members of the committee the temple became famous and daily hundreds of people visited. There is a strong belief that the God will cure all diseases and will give prosperity to the devotees. The devotees will get Payakutti from the temple and stood developing as a great temple like the Sree Muthappan temple at Parassinikadavu.

See also 
 Parassinikkadavu
 Muthappan temple
 Kunnathoor Padi
 Rajarajeshwara Temple
 Sree Muthappan Temple Nileshwar
 Valluvan Kadav Sree Muthappan
 Temples of Kerala

References

Sree Parassini Muthappan
Sree Muthappan
Sree Muthappan
valluvan kadav sree muthappan
photos of valluvan kadav sree muthappan
valluvan kadav sree muthappan theyyam

Hindu temples in Kerala
Hindu temples in Kasaragod district